Hoffa: The Real Story is an autobiography by Jimmy Hoffa and Oscar Fraley published in 1975 by Stein & Day. In 2019, the book was rereleased by Graymalkin Media.

Hoffa had published an earlier autobiography titled The Trials of Jimmy Hoffa (1970).

References 

1975 non-fiction books
American autobiographies
Jimmy Hoffa